Adrar is a province (wilaya) in southwestern Algeria, named after its capital Adrar. It is the second-largest province, with an area of 424,948 km2, roughly the size of the US state of California. It had 402,197 inhabitants at the 2008 population census.

It is bordered by five other wilayas: to the west by Tindouf; to the north by Béchar and El Bayadh; to the east by Ghardaïa and Tamanrasset. To the south, it is bordered by Mauritania and Mali.

Adrar is composed of three natural and cultural regions: Touat (Adrar, Zaouiet Kounta),  Gourara (Aougrout, Timimoune) and Tidikelt (Aoulef), and 299 ksour.

History
The province was created from parts of the Oasis department and Saoura department in 1974.

Geography

Location 
The province of Adrar is located in south-west Algeria.

Administrative divisions
The province comprises 7 districts (daïras) and 16 communes or municipalities (baladiyahs)

The following table shows the list of districts in the province of Adrar and all the communes in each district.

Districts

 Adrar
 Aougrout
 Aoulef
 Bordj Badji Mokhtar
 Charouine
 Fenoughil
 Reggane
 T'Sabit
 Timimoun
 Tinerkouk
 Zaouiet Kounta

Communes

See also

 In Belbel
 Krettamia

References

External links
 Adrar Province

 
Provinces of Algeria
States and territories established in 1974